Autochloris enagrus is a moth of the subfamily Arctiinae. It was described by Pieter Cramer in 1780. It is found in Brazil (Tefé) and Suriname.

References

Arctiinae
Moths described in 1780
Moths of South America